Damascene may refer to:
 Topics directly associated with the city of Damascus in Syria:
 A native or inhabitant of Damascus
 Damascus Arabic, the local dialect of Damascus
 Damascus steel, developed for swordmaking 
 "Damascene moment", the religious conversion of Paul
 Animal breeds:
 Damascene (pigeon)
 Damascus goat
 John of Damascus (c. 676-749), Syrian Christian monk and priest
 Materials technologies evoking the visual texture of Damascus steel:
Damascening, of inlaying different metals into one another
Damask, a reversible figured fabric